William Taylor Barry (February 5, 1784 – August 30, 1835) was an American statesman, jurist and slave owner. He served as Postmaster General for most of the administration of President Andrew Jackson and was the only Cabinet member not to resign in 1831 as a result of the Petticoat affair.

History
Born near Lunenburg, Virginia, he moved to Fayette County, Kentucky, in 1796 with his parents John Barry, an American Revolutionary War veteran, and Susannah (Dozier) Barry. He attended the common schools, Pisgah Academy and Kentucky Academy in Woodford County, Transylvania University at Lexington and graduated from the College of William & Mary at Williamsburg, Virginia in 1803, after which studied law and was admitted to the bar in 1805. He commenced practice at Jessamine County, Kentucky and then at Lexington.

Political life
Elected to the Kentucky House of Representatives in 1807, Barry became a member of the U.S. House of Representatives from 1810 to 1811, then served in the War of 1812. From 1815 to 1816, he became a U.S. Senator from Kentucky, then won election to the Kentucky Senate and served from 1817 to 1821. During his time in the Kentucky Senate Barry wrote to former President James Madison seeking support for a plan of subsidizing public education across the state; Madison responded enthusiastically and included in his letter of August 4, 1822 the often-cited observation: "A popular Government, without popular information or the means of acquiring it, is but a Prologue to a Farce or a Tragedy; or, perhaps both."

Meanwhile, Kentucky suffered from the Panic of 1819 and Barry became a leading figure in the debt relief party, which was successful in the elections between 1820 and 1824, although less successful when creditors challenged the relief laws in the courts. As a lawyer, Barrry argued in support of those laws, which the Kentucky Court of Appeals overturned in 1823. Barry also became the sixth Lieutenant Governor of Kentucky (1820 to 1824), then served as Secretary of State of Kentucky (1824 to 1825). He resigned that position to become Chief Judge of the Kentucky Court of Appeals (the predecessor to the Kentucky Supreme Court) for the 1825 term during the Old Court - New Court controversy. Although the Old Court party won the 1826 elections, Barry ran for Governor of Kentucky in 1828.

Barry became U.S. Postmaster General in Andrew Jackson's administration, serving from 1829 to 1835. While Postmaster General, he outlawed the mailing of William Lloyd Garrison's abolitionist newspaper, The Liberator.

He was the only member of Jackson's original Cabinet not to resign as a result of the Petticoat Affair, which involved the social ostracism of Margaret O'Neill Eaton, the wife of Secretary of War John H. Eaton by a coalition of Cabinet members wives led by Second Lady Floride Calhoun. Barry, like Jackson, had sided with the Eatons.

Appointments and awards
He was appointed ambassador to Spain, but died before he could take office en route to his post, while stopped in Liverpool, England August 30, 1835. He was originally interred and a cenotaph still stands at St. James's Cemetery, Liverpool, England; he was reinterred in 1854 at Frankfort Cemetery, Frankfort, Kentucky.

Barry County, Michigan, Barry County, Missouri, Barry, Missouri, Barrytown Barrytown, New York and Barryville, New York are named in his honor.

Societies
During the 1820s, Barry was a member of the prestigious society, Columbian Institute for the Promotion of Arts and Sciences, who counted among their members former presidents Andrew Jackson and John Quincy Adams and many prominent men of the day, including well-known representatives of the military, government service, medical, and other professions.

Personal
Barry was an uncle to Kentucky Governor Luke P. Blackburn.

References

Biography

External links

|-

|-

|-

|-

|-

1784 births
1835 deaths
American military personnel of the War of 1812
American slave owners
Burials at Frankfort Cemetery
United States Postmasters General
Lieutenant Governors of Kentucky
United States senators from Kentucky
Mason family
Members of the Kentucky House of Representatives
Kentucky state senators
Ambassadors of the United States to Spain
College of William & Mary alumni
Kentucky lawyers
Transylvania University alumni
Secretaries of State of Kentucky
Democratic-Republican Party United States senators
People from Lunenburg County, Virginia
Jackson administration cabinet members
19th-century American diplomats
Democratic-Republican Party members of the United States House of Representatives from Kentucky
19th-century American politicians
Judges of the Kentucky Court of Appeals
United States senators who owned slaves